The 2019 Fruits Basket anime series is the second based on the manga series of the same name by Natsuki Takaya, this time adapting all 23 volumes of the story. The new anime adaptation was announced in November 2018, featuring a new cast and staff, as per 's request, with TMS Entertainment handling the 63 episodes-long production from April 2019 to June 2021, divided into three seasons.  directed the series, with  handling series composition and  handling character designs. The reboot is a co-production of Funimation, who released the series through Crunchyroll-Funimation partnership. 

The first season adapted the manga's first 5 volumes and parts of volumes 6 and 7. It ran for 25 episodes from April 6 to September 21, 2019 on TV Tokyo, TV Osaka, and TV Aichi. The first opening theme for episodes 1–13 is "Again" by Beverly. The first ending theme for episodes 1–13 is "Lucky Ending" by Vickeblanka. The second ending theme for episodes 14–25 is "One Step Closer" by INTERSECTION.

The second season adapted the rest of volumes 6 and 7 and all content from volume 8 to the beginning of volume 17. It aired from April 7 to September 22, 2020. The third opening theme for episodes 26–38 is "Prism" by AmPm ft Miyuna. The third ending theme for episodes 26–38 is "ad meliora" by THE CHARM PARK. The fourth ending theme for episodes 39 onwards is "Eden" by Monkey Majik.

The third and final season adapted the remaining content of the manga series. It aired from April 6 to June 29, 2021, titled Fruits Basket: The Final.  The fifth opening theme is "Pleasure", by WARPs UP, and the fifth ending theme is "Haru Urara" by GENIC.

Funimation licensed the 2019 remake anime for a simulcast in partnership with Crunchyroll and produced an English version as part of their simuldub program. Unlike the Japanese version, a good majority of the English dub's cast reprised their roles from the original anime. Funimation's English dub of the remake series began airing on ABC Me in Australia starting on June 19, 2020. Episode 19 was skipped in ABC Me's broadcast run, likely due to the episode's content.

Series overview

Episode list

Season 1 (2019)

Season 2 (2020)

Season 3 (2021)

Home media

Region 1 (North America)

Region 2 (Japan)

See also

 Fruits Basket (2001 TV series)

Notes

References

Fruits Basket
Fruits Basket (2019)

Fruits Basket (2019)